Sergey Antonov is a Russian-born cellist, living in the United States. In 2007 he was the gold prize winner at the International Tchaikovsky Competition.

Biography

Born in Moscow in 1983 to two cellists, one a teacher at the Central Music School at the Moscow Conservatory, the other a Bolshoi Symphony Orchestra cellist, Antonov began studying the cello at age five. After graduating from the Moscow Conservatory, he studied at an advanced level with, among others, the legendary Mstislav Rostropovich. He is currently an Artist Diploma student at Boston's Longy School of Music.

In 2008, he inaugurated, together with pianist Constantine Finehouse, the Trieste Chamber Music Association's Salotto Cameristico to great acclaim.

References
 www.sergeyantonov.com

Russian cellists
Living people
1983 births
Musicians from Moscow
Moscow Conservatory alumni
Longy School of Music of Bard College alumni